Cotton Plant is an unincorporated community in Dunklin County, in the U.S. state of Missouri.

History
A post office was established at Cotton Plant in 1875. The community most likely was named for the fact it was a shipping point of cotton.

References

Unincorporated communities in Dunklin County, Missouri
Unincorporated communities in Missouri